The Drive Prep School is a mixed private school located in Hove in the English county of East Sussex. The school teaches children from approx. 7 to 16 years.

References

External links
The Drive Prep School official website

Private schools in Brighton and Hove